This is a list of Roman dams and reservoirs. The study of Roman dam-building has received little scholarly attention in comparison to their other civil engineering activities, even though their contributions in this field have been ranked alongside their expertise in constructing the well-known Roman aqueducts, bridges, and roads.

Roman dam construction began in earnest in the early imperial period. For the most part, it concentrated on the semi-arid fringe of the empire, namely the provinces of North Africa, the Near East, and Hispania. The relative abundance of Spanish dams below is due partly to more intensive field work there; for Italy only the Subiaco Dams, created by emperor Nero (54–68 AD) for recreational purposes, are attested. These dams are noteworthy, though, for their extraordinary height, which remained unsurpassed anywhere in the world until the Late Middle Ages.

The most frequent dam types were earth- or rock-filled embankment dams and masonry gravity dams. These served a wide array of purposes, such as irrigation, flood control, river diversion, soil-retention, or a combination of these functions.  In this, Roman engineering did not differ fundamentally from the practices of older hydraulic societies.

"The Romans' ability to plan and organise engineering construction on a grand scale" gave their dam construction special distinction. Their engineering prowess, therefore, facilitated the construction of large and novel reservoir dams, which secured a permanent water supply for urban settlements even during the dry season, a common concept today, but little-understood and -employed in ancient times.

The impermeability of Roman dams was increased by the introduction of waterproof hydraulic mortar and especially Roman concrete in the Roman architectural revolution. These materials also allowed for bigger structures to be built, like the Lake Homs Dam, possibly the largest water barrier to date, and the sturdy Harbaqa Dam, both of which consist of a concrete core.

On the whole, Roman dam engineering displayed a high degree of completeness and innovativeness. While hitherto dams relied solely on their heavy weight to resist the thrust of water, Roman builders were the first to realize the stabilizing effect of arches and buttresses, which they integrated into their dam designs. Previously unknown dam types introduced by the Romans include:
arch-gravity dams 
arch dams 
buttress dams  
multiple-arch buttress dams 

The origin of the so-called weir bridges, which were to become a popular design in Iran thereafter, can also be traced to the forced labour of Roman prisoners of war (see Band-e Kaisar).

List 
This list is sorted by maximum height. All measurements are in m; in case of differing values, more recent respectively more detailed studies were given preference. In earth dams, thickness refers to the masonry wall.

See also 
Record-holding dams in antiquity
Roman architecture
Roman engineering

References

Sources

Further reading 
 Vita-Finzi, Claudio (1961), "Roman Dams in Tripolitania", Antiquity 35: 14–20

External links 

Traianus – Technical investigation of Roman public works (see section Saeptum Fluminum)
"Barrages romains du Portugal. Types et fonctions", Mélanges de la Casa de Velázquez (2006) 

Roman
List of Roman dams and reservoirs

Dams and reservoirs